Haq Rural District is in Nalus District of Oshnavieh County, West Azerbaijan province, Iran. At the National Census of 2006, its population was 8,556 in 1,472 households. There were 8,824 inhabitants in 2,258 households at the following census of 2011. At the most recent census of 2016, the population of the rural district was 9,168 in 2,257 households. The largest of its 18 villages was Sengan, with 1,198 people.

References 

Oshnavieh County

Rural Districts of West Azerbaijan Province

Populated places in West Azerbaijan Province

Populated places in Oshnavieh County